A placental artery may refer to:
A maternal spiral artery
A fetal chorionic artery